The European Figure Skating Championships is an annual figure skating competition sanctioned by the International Skating Union in which figure skaters compete for the title of European Champion in the disciplines of men's singles, ladies' singles, pair skating, and ice dancing. The competitions took place from February 27 to March 3, 1962 in Geneva, Switzerland.

Results

Men

Judges were
 E. Kucharz 
 P. Baron 
 Carla Listing 
 A. Walker 
 Pamela Davis 
 P. Balázs 
 E. Cattaneo 
 Christen Christensen 
 E. Kirchhofer

Ladies

Judges were
 Oskar Madl 
 H. Hoyoux 
 H. Dudová 
 N. Valdes 
 E. Bauch 
 Theo Klemm 
 L. P. Barrajo 
 C. Benedict-Stieber 
 Christen Christensen

Pairs

Judges were
 W. Malek 
 E. Skakala 
 E. Bauch 
 A. Walker 
 Pamela Davis 
 P. Balázs 
 Christen Christensen 
 R. Steinmann 
 Tatiana Tolmacheva

Ice dancing

Judges were
 E. Skakala 
 L. Lauret 
 H. Wollersen 
 Pamela Davis 
 P. Balázs 
 C. Benacchi-Bordogna 
 E. Kirchhofer

References

Sources
 Result List provided by the ISU

European Figure Skating Championships, 1962
European Figure Skating Championships
European Figure Skating Championships
1962 European Figure Skating Championships
International figure skating competitions hosted by Switzerland
Sports competitions in Geneva
20th century in Geneva
February 1962 sports events in Europe
March 1962 sports events in Europe